Galeb (en. Seagull) was an 8-bit computer developed by the PEL Varaždin company in Yugoslavia in the early 1980s. A grand total of 250 were produced by the end of the summer of 1984, before being replaced by Orao.

Galeb was designed by Miroslav Kocijan and inspired by Compukit UK101 and Ohio Scientific Superboard and Superboard II computers that appeared in the UK and USA in 1979 and were less expensive than Apple II, Commodore PET and/or TRS-80 computers. The code name YU101 was chosen to resemble Compukit's UK101.

Galeb was very similar to computers that inspired it:

Specifications:
 CPU: MOS Technology 6502
 ROM : 16 KB (with BASIC interpreter  and Machine code monitor)
 RAM : 9 KB (expandable to 64 KB)
 Keyboard: 59-key QWERTZ
 I/O ports: composite video and RF TV out, cassette tape interface (DIN-5), RS-232 (D-25), edge expansion connector
 Sound : single-channel, 5 octaves
 Graphics: monochrome, 96x48 pixels
 Text mode: 16 lines with 48 characters each
 Price : 90,000 dinars (in 1984)

References

External links
 Galeb in Old-Computers.com
 MESS, Multi-System Emulator which supports Galeb

Computer-related introductions in 1981
Personal computers